Integrin alpha-6 is a protein that in humans is encoded by the ITGA6 gene.

Function 

The ITGA6 protein product is the integrin alpha chain alpha 6. Integrins are integral cell-surface proteins composed of an alpha chain and a beta chain. A given chain may combine with multiple partners resulting in different integrins. For example, alpha 6 may combine with beta 4 in the integrin referred to as TSP180, or with beta 1 in the integrin VLA-6. Integrins are known to participate in cell adhesion as well as cell-surface mediated signalling. Two transcript variants encoding different isoforms have been found for this gene. Specific loss of this integrin chain in the intestinal epithelium, and thus of their hemidesmosomes, induces long-standing colitis and infiltrating adenocarcinomas.

Interactions 

ITGA6 has been shown to interact with TSPAN4 and GIPC1.

See also 
 Cluster of differentiation
 Integrins

References

Further reading

External links 
 
ITGA6 Info with links in the Cell Migration Gateway 

Integrins
Clusters of differentiation